Football Association of Jerantut is an amateur football club based in Jerantut, Pahang. The club currently competes in the Liga Bolasepak Rakyat, the fourth division of the Malaysian football league.

History
Jerantut FA participated in FA Cup 2019 as they progress in Liga Bolasepak Rakyat 2018. As an amateur football club, Jerantut entering the FA Cup in first round, beating MP Besut FA. After that they are facing Johor Bahru FA in the second round and win with 3-0 score at Tun Abdul Razak Stadium, Jengka. After 3rd round voting, they are handed huge task to play with Perak. Despite strict financial status, Jerantut still wanted to play as home team despite being offered by Perak to play at Stadium Perak. The game versus Perak at Stadium Tun Abdul Razak in the 3rd round FA Cup concluded with Jerantut lost by 1-2 to more superior Perak player despite leading in the final minutes in the first half by perfect freekick from Mohd Firdaus. Jerantut was shocked by 2 goals from Wander Luiz in the dying minutes of 75 and 85. With that Jerantut followed JDT out from Malaysia FA Cup challenge 2019.

Honours

Cup
Sultan Pahang Cup
Champions(2) : 2015, 2017
Runners-up : 2018

References

External links
 
 Liga Bolasepak Rakyat
 Official Liga Bolasepak Rakyat Facebook

2013 establishments in Malaysia
Football clubs in Malaysia
Jerantut District
 
Sport in Pahang